Wenceslaus Hájek of Libočany (died 18 March 1553) was a Bohemian chronicler, author of famous Czech Chronicle (1541), also called the Hájek's Chronicle. This work served as the main source of Czech historical and national consciousness until the end of the 18th century, when numerous errors and fabrications contained in it were recognized.

Life
A scion of a noble family based in Libočany near Žatec, western Bohemia, Hajek was ordained priest of the Kostelec parish near Budyně nad Ohří in 1520. One year later, he became a chaplain in Zlonice. Hajek initially was a member of the Bohemian Unity of the Brethren but later converted to Catholicism (a significantly minority religion in otherwise Protestant Bohemia at that time). 

In 1524 he served as a preacher at the St. Thomas' Church in Prague quarter Malá Strana (Lesser Town); from 1527 as a dean of Karlštejn Castle and a priest in Tetín. In May 1533, he was appointed royal administrator of the Vyšehrad Chapter. Hájek reached the peak of ecclesiastical career when he became provost of Stará Boleslav Chapter, however, he fell from grace shortly afterwards and retired to Prague.

Works
His famous Czech Chronicle (Kronika česká in original), written in old humanistic Czech, cover the history of the Czech lands from the legendary early medieval rulers Lech, Czech, and Rus up to the coronation of King Ferdinand I in 1526. It was translated into German by Johann Sandel (1596), and later extensively studied by Johann Wolfgang von Goethe (1749–1832). Long considered one of the best sources of Czech history, modern criticism has found it to be quite inaccurate, although still useful for information about Czech literature traditions of the time.

Notes

References
  This work in turn cites:
 Palacky, Würdigung der alten böhmischen Geschichtschreiber (Prague, 1830–69)

External links
Kronika Česká digitalised copy 

1553 deaths
1500s births
16th-century Bohemian writers
Czech male writers
16th-century Bohemian historians
16th-century Bohemian Roman Catholic priests
People from Louny District